USF Baseball Stadium at Red McEwen Field is a baseball stadium located in Tampa, Florida, United States. It is home to the University of South Florida Bulls baseball team of the Division I American Athletic Conference. The facility has a capacity of 3,211 spectators. Opening in 2011, it replaced Red McEwen Field as the home of USF's baseball team.

Features of the ballpark include a 1,500-seat grandstand with canopy, a berm which can accommodate over 1,700 additional spectators along each foul line and in left field, in-ground dugouts, fan pavilions, press box, batting cages, a large Daktronics scoreboard, party pavilions in left and right field, and the Donaldson Deck, a party deck where fans can view both the baseball field and adjacent USF Softball Stadium field at the same time.

History 
After the demolition of Red McEwen Field following the 2010 season, construction of a new facility on the same location began. The alignment of the new field was changed, with home plate moving from the northwest corner to the southwest corner, to accommodate a concourse shared with the newly constructed neighboring USF Softball Stadium and create the USF Baseball/Softball Complex. The physical field is still named after McEwen, as can be seen on the backstop behind home plate, but the stadium is called USF Baseball Stadium.

Construction was completed over the 2010–2011 off season, with the stadium hosting its first game on February 25, 2011. The first game at the ballpark set a new attendance record for the team with 3,126 fans (the old field had a capacity of 2,500). Later that season, the Bulls set a new program attendance record again with a sellout crowd of 3,211 fans in a loss to No. 1 Florida.

In 2011, the first year of the stadium's opening, the Bulls ranked 29th in Division I college baseball in attendance.

In 2012, college baseball writer Eric Sorenson ranked the stadium as the fifth most underrated venue in Division I baseball.

During a game against Army on March 16, 2017, Bulls pitchers Shane McClanahan and Carson Ragsdale combined to throw the first no-hitter in the stadium's history.

As of the end of the 2021 season, the Bulls have a 239–128–1 record at the stadium

See also
 List of NCAA Division I baseball venues

References

External links
Team website

South Florida Bulls baseball venues
Baseball venues in Florida
2011 establishments in Florida
Sports venues completed in 2011
South Florida Bulls sports venues